Down Home is an American sitcom television series created by Barton Dean, that aired on NBC from April 12, 1990 to May 18, 1991. Ted Danson served as series co-producer.

Premise
New York City executive Kate McCrorey returned to visit her home town of Hadley Cove, Texas, a Gulf Coast fishing village, only to end up staying there to try to save her father Walt's bait and tackle shop from condominium developer Wade Prescott, Kate's ex-boyfriend.

Cast
Judith Ivey as Kate McCrorey
Ray Baker as Wade Prescott
Eric Allan Kramer as Drew McCrorey
Dakin Matthews as Walt McCrorey
Timothy Scott as Grover
Gedde Watanabe as Tran

Episodes

Season 1 (1990)

Season 2 (1991)

References

External links

NBC original programming
1990s American sitcoms
1990 American television series debuts
1991 American television series endings
Television shows set in Texas
English-language television shows
Television series by CBS Studios